Dante Spinotti, A.S.C., A.I.C. (born 22 August 1943) is an Italian cinematographer and a member of the board of governors of the Academy of Motion Picture Arts and Sciences. He is known for his collaborations with directors Michael Mann, Michael Apted, Deon Taylor, and Brett Ratner, and is frequently credited with helping to pioneer the use of high-definition digital video in cinematography. He is a BAFTA Award recipient and two-time Academy Award nominee (for L.A. Confidential and The Insider).

Biography
Spinotti was born in Tolmezzo, near the Austrian border. He began experimenting with still photography at the age of 11 with a camera given to him by his uncle, a cinematographer and director specializing in documentaries and newsreels. He worked as a camera operator on documentaries for much of his early career.

Among the more notable films he has worked on are The Last of the Mohicans, Heat, and L.A. Confidential. Spinotti also was the cinematographer for Brett Ratner's films, such as Red Dragon (2002), After the Sunset (2004), and X-Men: The Last Stand (2006).

Spinotti was the cinematographer on both adaptations of the novel Red Dragon by Thomas Harris: Michael Mann's 1986 adaptation (titled Manhunter), and Brett Ratner's 2002 adaptation. He won the Golden Camera 300 award at the Manaki Brothers Film Festival in North Macedonia for lifetime achievement.

Filmography

References

External links
 
 Quality screengrabs of Dante Spinotti's fine cinematography on Manhunter (1986)
 Profile at New York Times
 Profile at American Cinematographer
 Interview for International Cinematographers Guild
 Interview for LightTools

1943 births
Living people
Best Cinematography BAFTA Award winners
David di Donatello winners
Ciak d'oro winners
Italian cinematographers
Italian expatriates in the United States
People from Tolmezzo